Chupkatha is a 2012 Bengali film directed by Souvick Sarkar and Dipankar Pal, and produced by Pratap Mandal under the banner of Great Overseas Commodeal Ltd. Based on extra-marital affairs, the film features actors Silajit Majumder, Aparajita Auddy and Payel Roy in the lead roles. It was released on 7 December 2012. In this film singer Silajit Majumder made his debut as a music composer.

Plot
The film is about an extra-marital affair involving a married man and a medical student. Sambit (Silajit Majumder) and his wife (Aparajita Auddy) are in love but they could never express their love for each other. Anwesha (Payel Roy) is a young medical student who happens to be as lonely as Sambit. Both of them required someone to share their emotions with. As a result, they start finding themselves comfortable with each other. Sambit helps Anwesha while she is still a student and in return, she gives him company. They experience an unspoken closeness towards each other and fall into a complicated relationship. Because the relationship has no future, neither of them could express their feelings, even as they love and share a mutual respect towards each other. Sambit later has a heart attack and Anwesha performs the operation for free since she considered she owed Sambit this. In the end, they part just as they meet, and things remain the way they were earlier.

Cast
 Silajit Majumder as Sambit
 Aparajita Auddy as Sambit's wife
 Payel Roy as Anwesha
 Bhaswar Chattopadhyay as Dr. Mukherjee
 Rumki Chatterjee as Anwesha's mother
 Ratri Ghatak
 Biplab Banerjee
 Sougata Bandyopadhyay

Soundtrack

The music of the film was composed by Silajit Majumder and the lyrics were penned by Srijato. Regarding the film score of Chupkatha, Silajit Majumder told that this was the first time he was doing full-fledged music for a film. The background music of the movie is scored by Rajkumar Sengupta.

Track listing

References

Bengali-language Indian films
2010s Bengali-language films